This page provides supplementary chemical data on phosphoryl chloride.

Material Safety Data Sheets 

Aldrich MSDS
Fisher MSDS
Baker MSDS

Thermodynamic properties

Spectral data

Structure and properties data

References
Chemical data pages
Chemical data pages cleanup